Alexander (Sasha) Kargaltsev is a Russian-born American artist, writer, photographer, actor and film director.

Biography
Alexander Kargaltsev was born in Moscow. He came to New York in 2010 to study at the New York Film Academy. He never came back to Russia after applying for asylum in the United States. As a photographer, Kargaltsev is known for his series of nude male portraiture. In 2012 he published a book Asylum with nude portraits of Russian gay asylum seekers in the United States. His activism works also included organization of a protest against IKEA for the removal of a photograph of a lesbian couple from the Russian edition of Ikea Family Live magazine.
 
His short movies, The Cell (2010) and The Well (2009) won him a scholarship at the Russian State University of Cinematography. Kargaltsev moved to New York City in 2009 after winning a scholarship in New York Film Academy and applied to asylum in United States, citing persecution, based on his sexual orientation. Kargaltsev's asylum was approved in May 2011 after nine months of hearings. The evidences gathered was presented to USA Immigration and Naturalization Services.

Kargaltsev's debut as a theatre director was the play The Net, staged in Dixon Place in New York. He directed the play Crematorium, based on a story written by Russian playwright Valeriy Pecheykin. The play was staged in its abridged version at New York's Shelter Studios and Gene Frankel Theatre.

At the time of the Sochi Olympics, Alexander Kargaltsev responded to a controversial photo of Russian-American gallerist Dasha Zhukova. On her photo, she is sitting on a chair composed of a semi-nude black woman with her legs up in the air. In order to reverse the “Visual injustice and offense” of Zhukova's image, Kargaltsev created the image with a naked Afro-American man, who is sitting on a naked white man on his back with his legs aloft.

Exhibitions

Solo
2011 Polaroids "Mol'" gallery, Moscow
2012 "Asylum". Curated by Ivan Savvine. "287 Spring" Gallery. New York City
2014 "Last Polaroids". Leslie Lohman Museum of Gay and Lesbian Art. New York City
2017 "Disassembled". Friedman Gallery. New York.

Group
2010 "Hung Checking Out the Contemporary Male". "Gitana Rosa Williamsburg" Gallery. New York City.
2013 "Queerussia: the hidden (p)art". 'Mooiman' Gallery. Groningen, Netherlands.
2014 "Juicy". "Gitana Rosa Williamsburg" Gallery. New York City.
2015 "Same as You". Curated by Igor Zeiger. "Mazeh 9" Municipal youth art center gallery. Tel Aviv
2020 "The dark male model, Forbidden words". Galerie MooiMan. Groningen.

Publications

Collections 
Kargaltsev's works are in the permanent collection of the Leslie-Lohman Museum of Gay and Lesbian Art.

Gallery

References

External links

Polaroids 
The Well by Kargaltsev on Vimeo
Interview with Kargaltsev on Radio Svoboda
Alexander Kargaltsev in Visual AIDS

Year of birth missing (living people)
Living people
Photographers from New York (state)
Gay photographers
LGBT people from New York (state)
American theatre directors
Photographers from Moscow
Russian gay artists
Russian LGBT photographers
21st-century Russian LGBT people
Russian emigrants to the United States